Ira Robbins may refer to:

 Ira Robbins, editor and publisher of Trouser Press
 Ira Robbins, President and CEO of Valley Bank
 Ira P. Robbins, legal scholar and professor of law specializing in criminal law